The True Adventures of Wolfboy is a 2019 American coming-of-age film directed by Martin Krejčí and written by Olivia Dufault. The film stars Jaeden Martell, Chris Messina, Eve Hewson, Chloë Sevigny, John Turturro, Nick Pulinski, and introduces Sophie Giannamore as Artistiana. It tells the story of a teenage boy with hypertrichosis who leaves home to find his mother while befriending a "mermaid" transgender girl.

It had its world premiere at the Karlovy Vary International Film Festival on July 2, 2019, and was released on October 30, 2020, by Vertical Entertainment.

Premise

A teenage boy named Paul Harker (Jaeden Martell) has a skin condition that causes his skin to grow werewolf-like fur and hair all around it. He runs away from home and his father Denny (Chris Messina) in the search for his estranged mother. After a brief stint with the exploiting amusement park owner Mr. Silk (John Turturro) in order to fund his travels, Paul befriends a "mermaid" transgender girl and an aspiring singer named Aristiana (Sophie Giannamore) who becomes his companion as Denny, Mr. Silk, and Detective Pollok (Michelle Wilson) each pursue him.

Cast
 Jaeden Martell as Paul Harker, a boy with hypertrichosis.
 Sophie Giannamore as Aristiana, a "mermaid" transgender girl and aspiring singer who befriends Paul.
 Chris Messina as Denny Harker, Paul's father who sets out to find his son when he goes missing.
 Eve Hewson as Rose, a bar patron in an eyepatch who knows Aristiana and later joins Paul in his journey.
 Chloë Sevigny as Jen, Paul's estranged mother.
 John Turturro as Mr. Silk, an amusement park owner who exploits Paul's condition for money and later tracks him across the country.
 Nick Pulinski as Percy, the leader of Paul's bullies from school.
 Michelle Wilson as Pollok, a detective who helps Denny find Paul.
 Stephen McKinley Henderson as Nicholas, Paul's estranged grandfather who lives with Jen and also suffers from hypertrichosis.
 Melissa Mandisa as Aristiana's Mother, an ignorant yet concerned parent.
 JJ Alfieri as Gas Station Clerk
 Bill Smith and Joshua R. Aragon as the Carnival Patrons
 Bob Rusch and Greg Hinaman as the Clowns
 Margo Davis as Mom
 Kristy Nolen as Percy's Mom
 Sheri Fairchild as Jezebel the Laughing Clown
 Mikey Tenerelli as Hairy Larry
 Colin Patrick Farrell as Buck, one of Paul's bullies who serves as Percy's yes-men.

Production
Principal photography for the film began in mid-September 2017 in the Buffalo Niagara Region.

Release
It had its world premiere at the Karlovy Vary International Film Festival on July 2, 2019. In September 2020, Vertical Entertainment acquired U.S. distribution rights to the film. They released it on October 30, 2020.

Critical reception
The site's critics' consensus reads, "The True Adventures of Wolfboy can be frustratingly uneven, but a worthy story and compassion for its characters help make this coming-of-age story's flaws easy to forgive." Albert Nowicki of Filmawka called the film "charming", and believed it should be applauded for its inclusion of both the transgender character (Aristiana) and trans actress (Sophie Giannamore).

Accolades
The True Adventures of Wolfboy was nominated for the 2021 GLAAD Media Award for Outstanding Film (Limited Release).

References

External links
 
 

2010s coming-of-age films
2019 films
American coming-of-age films
American teen LGBT-related films
Films about trans women
2010s English-language films
2010s American films